Kemal Erer (born 2 March 1948) is a Turkish archer. He competed in the men's individual event at the 1984 Summer Olympics.

References

1948 births
Living people
Turkish male archers
Olympic archers of Turkey
Archers at the 1984 Summer Olympics
Sportspeople from Ankara